Robert Slaney (born October 13, 1988) is a Canadian ice hockey left winger who is currently a free agent. He most recently played for the Hamilton Bulldogs of the American Hockey League.

Career 
After starting his career in the Toronto Maple Leafs organization, Slaney was traded with Brett Lebda to the Nashville Predators for Matthew Lombardi and Cody Franson on July 3, 2011. He was then traded, along with Blake Geoffrion and a second round pick, to the Montreal Canadiens for defenseman Hal Gill and a conditional fifth round draft pick.

Career statistics

References

External links
 

1988 births
Living people
Canadian ice hockey left wingers
Cape Breton Screaming Eagles players
Cincinnati Cyclones (ECHL) players
Hamilton Bulldogs (AHL) players
Ice hockey people from Newfoundland and Labrador
Milwaukee Admirals players
Reading Royals players
Toronto Marlies players
Universiade medalists in ice hockey
Universiade gold medalists for Canada
Competitors at the 2013 Winter Universiade